Taza Airport  is an airport serving the city of Taza, Morocco.

It currently serves small airplanes of less than 5,700 kg and is mainly used by the  fire-fighters brigade for forest fires and pesticide distribution.

See also
Transport in Morocco
List of airports in Morocco

References

External links
 OurAirports - Taza
  Great Circle Mapper - Taza

 Google Earth

Airports in Morocco